Tonia Papapetrou (born 8 December 2000) is a Cypriot swimmer. She competed in the women's 100 metre freestyle event at the 2018 FINA World Swimming Championships (25 m), in Hangzhou, China. In 2019, she won the silver medal in the women's 4 × 100 metre freestyle relay event at the 2019 Games of the Small States of Europe held in Budva, Montenegro.

References

2000 births
Living people
Cypriot female swimmers
Cypriot female freestyle swimmers
Place of birth missing (living people)